The crawler-transporters, formally known as the Missile Crawler Transporter Facilities, are a pair of tracked vehicles used to transport spacecraft from NASA's Vehicle Assembly Building (VAB) along the Crawlerway to Launch Complex 39.  They were originally used to transport the  Saturn IB and Saturn V rockets during the Apollo, Skylab and Apollo–Soyuz programs. They were then used to transport Space Shuttles from 1981 to 2011. The crawler-transporters carry vehicles on the mobile launcher platforms used by NASA, and after each launch return to the pad to take the platform back to the VAB.

Upon its construction, the crawler-transporter became the largest self-powered land vehicle in the world until it was beaten in 2013 with the production of the ultraheavy XGC88000 crawler crane. While other vehicles such as bucket-wheel excavators like Bagger 288, dragline excavators like Big Muskie and power shovels like The Captain are significantly larger, they are powered by external sources.

The two crawler-transporters were added to the National Register of Historic Places on January 21, 2000.

Specifications

Each track has 57 shoes, and each shoe weighs . The vehicle measures . A separate laser docking system provides pinpoint accuracy when the crawler-transporter and Mobile Launch Platform are positioned in the VAB or at the launch pad. A team of nearly 30 engineers, technicians and drivers operate the vehicle, centered on an internal control room, and the crawler is driven from two control cabs located at either end. Before the launch the crawler-transporter is removed.

The crawlers were overhauled in 2003 with upgrades to the Motor Control Center, which houses the switchgear and electrical controls of all of major systems on board; a new engine and pump ventilation system; new diesel engine radiators; and replacement of the two driver cabs on each vehicle (one on each end). As of 2003, each crawler had 16 traction motors, powered by four  generators, in turn driven by two  V16 ALCO 251C diesel engines. Two  generators, driven by two  engines, were used for jacking, steering, lighting, and ventilating. Two  generators were also available to power the Mobile Launcher Platform. The crawler's tanks held  of diesel fuel, and it burned .

The crawlers traveled along the  Crawlerways, to LC-39A and LC-39B, respectively, at a maximum speed of  loaded, or  unloaded. The average trip time from the VAB along the Crawlerway to Launch Complex 39 is about five hours. In 2000, NASA unearthed and restored an Apollo-era segment of the Crawlerway to provide access to High Bay 2 in the VAB in order to provide protection from a hurricane for up to three Shuttles at the same time.

Kennedy Space Center has been using the same two crawlers since their initial delivery in 1965. They are now nicknamed "Hans and Franz", after the parodic Austrian body-builder characters on Saturday Night Live, played by Dana Carvey and Kevin Nealon.

Future use

Crawler-Transporter 2
NASA currently plans to use crawler-transporter 2 to transport the Space Launch System with the Orion spacecraft atop it from the Vehicle Assembly Building to Launch Pad 39B for the Artemis missions. Early in 2016, NASA finished upgrading crawler-transporter 2 (CT-2) to a "Super Crawler" for use in the Artemis program. NASA performed a rollout of the Artemis 1 Space Launch System and Orion on March 17, 2022 for the first Wet Dress Rehearsal, and the rollout for launch, which launched in November 2022. The rollout for the WDR, marked the first time one of the crawler transporters rolled a launch vehicle to the launch pad since STS-135.

Crawler-Transporter 1
NASA had originally planned for crawler-transporter 1 to be used by commercial launch vehicles. In April 2016, then Orbital ATK, now Northrop Grumman Innovation Systems, and NASA entered negotiations for the lease of CT-1 and one of the four Vehicle Assembly Building bays. Northrop Grumman has originally planned to use CT-1 to transport their OmegA from the Vehicle Assembly Building to Launch Pad 39B. OmegA however was cancelled in September of 2020 after Northrop Grumman lost the National Security Space Launch contract to United Launch Alliance and SpaceX.

Appearances in popular culture
The crawler-transporters have featured in television and movies. In a 2007 season three episode of Dirty Jobs, host Mike Rowe helps workers maintain a crawler-transporter and takes the vehicle for a short drive. The crawler was also seen in the 1995 film Apollo 13, the 2011 film Transformers: Dark of the Moon and the 2019 film Apollo 11. Similar vehicles also appeared in the 2013 film Pacific Rim.

In the Fallout 3 video game add-on pack "Broken Steel", the US government survivors, The Enclave, have a mobile base built on and into a heavily modified crawler. In Sid Meier's Alpha Centauri, various units are called "crawlers" and feature chassis based on the crawler-transporters. In Asphalt 8: Airborne, 3 crawler-transporters drive over the space center French Guiana track.

Gallery

See also 
 List of largest machines

References

External links

  - Crawler-transporter parking area at Kennedy Space Center

Apollo program hardware
Kennedy Space Center
Marion Power Shovel Company
NASA vehicles
National Register of Historic Places in Brevard County, Florida
Space Shuttle program
Tracked vehicles
Vehicles introduced in 1965